Nyanza Textile Industries Limited (Nytil), is an integrated textile manufacturing company in Uganda.

Location
The headquarters of the company and the company's factory are located in the town of Njeru, in Buikwe District, along the western bank of the Victoria Nile, between the Source of the Nile and Nalubaale Hydroelectric Power Station. Nytil lies approximately ,by road, east of Kampala, the capital and largest city in that country. The coordinates of the main office and factory are:0°26'10.0"N, 33°11'10.0"E (Latitude:0.436116; Longitude:33.186104).

The company also operates a second factory located on Kampala Road, in Kampala's central business district.

History
Nyanza Textitle Industries was established in 1954, by the colonial government as a parastatal company. The independent governments in Uganda ran the factory until 1996, when they sold it to Southern Range Nyanza Limited, the company that runs it today.

Overview
Nytil is the largest integrated textile industry, Uganda. It has facilities for spinning, weaving, coloring, and tailoring. Also in 24 hours, the factory can weave  and tailor 18,000 T-shirts. The plant produces 150,000 bales of fabric annually, of which 15,000 are sold inside Uganda and the rest is exported. In 2018, total revenue is planned at US$50m (Shs167 billion), compared to $40m (about Shs133 billion) in 2015.

Operations
The plant employs 1,500 in three shifts. This compares with 6,800 employees in 1996, whose output was less than that of the present workforce. The factory buys cotton from farmers from the districts of Kasese, Arua, Hoima and Masindi. The cotton used by this company is either imported from Tanzania or sourced from Kasese District in the Western Region of Uganda.

See also
 Economy of Uganda
 List of power stations in Uganda

References

External links
 Website of Nyanza Textile Industries Limited 
 Nytil urges government to enforce new textile policy

Manufacturing companies established in 1954
1954 establishments in Uganda
Buikwe District
Central Region, Uganda
Textile companies of Uganda